"Hold On" is a song written and recorded by American singer-songwriter Colbie Caillat. It was co-written and produced by Ryan Tedder, who had previously collaborated with Caillat on her 2011 single "Brighter Than the Sun". The song was released to digital retailers through Republic Records on November 19, 2013 originally as Gypsy Heart's lead single. After, the song wasn't included in the standart version of the album for uncertain reasons and replaced by "Try" as lead single. The song was included only in European version of the album. Upon its release, "Hold On" was generally well received by critics, who complimented the new musical direction.

Background
Caillat worked with "Brighter Than the Sun" collaborator Ryan Tedder on the song, and made a conscious effort to explore new musical territory. "[The song] lets people know that there aren't any boundaries," Caillat said of "Hold On". "It's always good to grow as an artist." In an interview with Billboard, Tedder called the song "a game changer" for Caillat, noting "it's gonna shock people." Tedder suggested the song "might be one of the biggest records [he's] done in years," while Republic Records co-founder Monte Lipman enthused to Billboard that "Hold On" was possibly "the best record of [Caillat's] career and something [they're] excited about."

Critical reception
Music blog POP! Goes the Charts gave the song a mixed review in which they pointed out the "stale and tired sounding" lyrics, while also praising the "explosive chorus" and crossover appeal. Billboard Magazine critic, Jonathan Nguyen, was more positive of the song: "While the lyrics run stale and hackneyed, Tedder lends his OneRepublic touch to the heavily Florence And The Machines-inspired anthemic track that soars on a bombastic arrangement of layered orchestral crescendos. The result is something that touches the soul". Robbie Daw of Idolator responded positively to the single's radio-friendliness: "with its oh-oh-ohs on the chorus, minimal lyrics and pleasant instrumentation, who knows — this all just might be repetitive enough to work its way into radio listeners’ brains to the point where it becomes the singer's biggest hit to-date." He also singled out Caillat's "emotional vocal delivery" on the track and compared it favorably to the works of popular contemporaries Katy Perry, Kelly Clarkson, and Leona Lewis.

Chart performance

References

2013 singles
Colbie Caillat songs
Republic Records singles
Songs written by Colbie Caillat
Songs written by Ryan Tedder
Song recordings produced by Ryan Tedder
2013 songs